Governor Hull may also refer to:

Jane Dee Hull (1935–2020), Governor of Arizona
William Hull (1753–1825), Territorial Governor of Michigan

See also
Governor Hall (disambiguation)